Ceratonova is a genus of myxozoan in the family Ceratomyxidae.

Species 
The following species are recognized in the genus Ceratonova:

 Ceratonova gasterostea Atkinson, Foott & Bartholomew, 2014
 Ceratonova shasta (Noble, 1950)

References 

Ceratomyxidae
Cnidarian genera